CNAM may refer to:
 Conservatoire national des arts et métiers (National Conservatory of Arts and Crafts), a French research and education institution
 Calling Name Presentation, a Caller ID service
 Canadian Network of Asset Managers, for municipal assets